Marjanović is a Serbian, Croatian and Bosnian surname, a patronymic derived from the masculine given name Marjan. Its bearers are Serbs, Croats and Bosniaks.

It is among the most common surnames in the Brod-Posavina County of Croatia.

It may refer to:

 Alimpije Marjanovic (1874-1940), Serbian revolutionary and Chetnik commander
 Andrija Marjanović (born 1999), Serbian basketball player
 Blagoje "Moša" Marjanović (1907–1984), Serbian football forward
 Boban "Bobi" Marjanović (1988–), Serbian professional basketball player
 Bogdan Marjanović (1980–), Serbian footballer
 Bojan Marjanović (born 1981), Serbian pianist and composer based in Norway
 Branko Marjanović (1909–1996), Croatian film director and editor
 Čedomir Marjanović (1906-1945), Serbian politician
 Đorđe Marjanović (1931–2021), Serbian and Yugoslav singer
 Dragan Marjanović (1954–), retired Bosnian football forward
 Filip Marjanović (born 1989), Serbian handball player
 Jovana Marjanović (1983–), Serbian beauty pageant titleholder
 Lazar Marjanović (born 1989), Serbian footballer
 Luka Marjanović (1805–1888), Croatian lawyer and ethnographer
 Marijan Marjanović (1904-1983), Croatian footballer
 Marko Marjanović (1985–), Serbian rower
 Mirko Marjanović (1926-?), Serbian basketball player and coach
 Mirko Marjanović (1937–2006), former Prime Minister of Serbia
 Mihael Marjanović (1998–), Croatian musician
 Mirko Marjanović (1940–), Croatian writer
 Nebojša Marjanović (born 1959), Serbian politician
 Nikola Marjanović (1905-1983), Serbian football player and manager
 Nikola Marjanović (born 1955), Serbian footballer
 Nikola Marjanović (born 1977), Croatian singer-songwriter
 Nikola Marjanović (born 2001), Serbian footballer
 Radoslav Marjanović (born 1989), Serbian politician
 Rista Marjanović (1885-1969), first Serbian photo-reporter
 Rodoljub Marjanović (1988–), Serbian football player
 Saša Marjanović (1987–), Serbian footballer
 Slavoljub Marjanović (born 1955), Serbian chess grandmaster
 Smilja Marjanović-Dušanić (born 1963), Serbian historian
 Srđan Marjanović (1952–), Serbian singer-songwriter
 Verona Marjanović (born 1974), Bosnian luger
 Vesna Marjanović (born 1969), Serbian politician
 Zana Marjanović (born 1983), Bosnian actress

References

Croatian surnames
Serbian surnames
Bosnian surnames
Patronymic surnames
Surnames from given names